Kapela is a municipality in Bjelovar-Bilogora County, Croatia. There are 3,516 inhabitants, of which 95% are Croats.

Municipalities of Croatia
Populated places in Bjelovar-Bilogora County